Asian Caribbeans are people who live in the Caribbean, but were born in Asia or are descended from people who were born in Asia.

The Asian Caribbean populations were the result of Coolie slaves and indentured labourers that were brought here by the coolie trade to work in mines, sugar plantations, etc.

See also
Chinese Caribbeans
Indo-Caribbeans
Japanese Caribbeans

External links
 South Asians in the Caribbean: a bibliography

 
 
Ethnic groups in the Caribbean